Alexander Stuart, 5th Earl of Moray,  (8 May 1634 – 1 November 1701) was a Scottish peer who held senior political office in Scotland under Charles II and his Catholic brother, James II & VII.

He was first brought into government in 1676 by the Duke of Lauderdale, his relative by marriage; between 1681 and 1686, he played a prominent role in the suppression of Presbyterian radicals, known as "the Killing Time". He retained his position when James succeeded in 1685 and supported his religious policies, having converting to Catholicism in 1686.

Removed from office after the 1688 Glorious Revolution, he retired from public life and died at Donibristle on 1 November 1701.

Life

Alexander Stuart was born in May 1634, second son of James, 4th Earl of Moray and Lady Margaret Home (1607–1683). His elder brother James died young and Alexander succeeded his father as Earl of Moray in 1653. He was one of eight children; in addition to James, the others being Mary (1628–1668), Margaret (1631–1667), Francis (1636–?), Henrietta (1640–1713), Archibald (1643–1688), and Anne (1644–1719).

In 1658, he married Emilia Balfour, daughter of Sir William Balfour and they had James, Lord Doune (1660–1685), Charles, 6th Earl (1673–1735), Francis, 7th Earl (1673–1739), John who died unmarried and without legitimate issue but had at least one son named William B.1737 in Banffshire (1675–1765) and Emilia (died after 1706).

Biography

During the Wars of the Three Kingdoms, his father raised a regiment that fought for the Covenanters against Royalist forces led by Montrose. He also supported the attempt to restore Charles I to power in the Second English Civil War, then Charles II in 1651.

Alexander succeeded his father as Earl of Moray on 4 March 1653, shortly after Scotland was incorporated into The Protectorate. After defeating the Royalist Glencairn's Rising in 1654, the new administration decided to draw a line under the civil wars and adopted a number of conciliatory measures. One of these was the 1654 Act of Grace and Pardon; a small number of key individuals had their estates confiscated, with others paying a fine. Moray was one of 73 individuals included in this list, although the original amount of £3,500 was eventually reduced to £500.

After the Restoration of Charles II in 1660, Moray became a Privy Councillor but remained a minor political figure. He was known as an opponent of Presbyterian radicals and in 1675, his uncle by marriage, the Duke of Lauderdale, named him Lord Justice General, replacing the Marquess of Atholl. He helped enforce increasingly harsh policies, including the death penalty for preaching at services held outside the approved church, or Conventicles, and was made a Commissioner of the Treasury in 1678.

In 1679, dissidents murdered Archbishop Sharp and Moray helped put down a short-lived rebellion. This resulted in his appointment on 17 July 1680 as an Extraordinary Lord of Session; when Lauderdale was dismissed soon after, he nominated Moray as Secretary of State in his place. James approved this, but insisted Moray share the position, first with Middleton, then Melfort. 

James became king in February 1685 with strong support in England and Scotland, leading to the rapid collapse of Argyll's Rising in June. However, measures for Catholic relief undercut the moderate Presbyterians and Episcopalians who then controlled the Church of Scotland and formed James' main support base. Their opposition forced him to rely on an ever smaller circle of loyalists; in 1686, Moray was appointed Lord High Commissioner to the Parliament of Scotland, charged with ensuring repeal of the 1681 Test Act.

Moray had converted to Catholicism in 1686; although this was not made this public until 1687, many suspected it and challenged his right to hold office at all. Despite threats and the removal from office of opponents, the Scottish Parliament refused to pass these measures, forcing James to use the Royal Prerogative.

In recognition of his status, Moray was one of eight founding members of the Order of the Thistle, created by James in 1687 to reward his key supporters. After the Glorious Revolution in November 1688, he was deprived of all his offices. He died at Donibristle on 1 November 1701, and buried in the church of Dyke on 24 January 1702.

References

Citations

Cited sources

External links
 
 

1634 births
1701 deaths
Knights of the Thistle
Lords Justice-General
Earls of Moray
Members of the Privy Council of Scotland
17th-century Scottish peers
17th-century Scottish politicians
Lords High Commissioner to the Parliament of Scotland
Extraordinary Lords of Session
Commissioners of the Treasury of Scotland
House of Stuart